In chemistry, a radical, also known as a free radical, is an atom, molecule, or ion that has at least one unpaired valence electron.
With some exceptions, these unpaired electrons make radicals highly chemically reactive.  Many radicals spontaneously dimerize.  Most organic radicals have short lifetimes.

A notable example of a radical is the hydroxyl radical (HO·), a molecule that has one unpaired electron on the oxygen atom. Two other examples are triplet oxygen and triplet carbene (꞉) which have two unpaired electrons.

Radicals may be generated in a number of ways, but typical methods involve redox reactions. Ionizing radiation, heat, electrical discharges, and electrolysis are known to produce radicals. Radicals are intermediates in many chemical reactions, more so than is apparent from the balanced equations.

Radicals are important in combustion, atmospheric chemistry, polymerization, plasma chemistry, biochemistry, and many other chemical processes. A majority of natural products are generated by radical-generating enzymes.  In living organisms, the radicals superoxide and nitric oxide and their reaction products regulate many processes, such as control of vascular tone and thus blood pressure. They also play a key role in the intermediary metabolism of various biological compounds. Such radicals can even be messengers in a process dubbed redox signaling.  A radical may be trapped within a solvent cage or be otherwise bound.

Formation
Radicals are either (1) formed from spin-paired molecules or (2) from other radicals. Radicals are formed from spin-paired molecules through homolysis of weak bonds or electron transfer, also known as reduction. Radicals are formed from other radicals through substitution, addition, and elimination reactions.

Radical formation from spin-paired molecules

Homolysis

Homolysis makes two new radicals from a spin-paired molecule by breaking a covalent bond, leaving each of the fragments with one of the electrons in the bond. Because breaking a chemical bond requires energy, homolysis occurs under the addition of heat or light. The bond dissociation energy associated with homolysis depends on the stability of a given compound, and some weak bonds are able to homolyze at relatively lower temperatures.

Some homolysis reactions are particularly important because they serve as an initiator for other radical reactions. One such example is the homolysis of halogens, which occurs under light and serves as the driving force for radical halogenation reactions.

Another notable reaction is the homolysis of dibenzoyl peroxide, which results in the formation of two benzoyloxy radicals and acts as an initiator for many radical reactions.

Reduction
Radicals can also form when a single electron is added to a spin-paired molecule, resulting in an electron transfer. This reaction, also called reduction, usually takes place with an alkali metal donating an electron to another spin-paired molecule.

Radical formation from other radicals

Abstraction

Hydrogen abstraction describes when a hydrogen atom is removed from a hydrogen donor molecule (e.g. tin or silicon hydride) with its one electron. Abstraction produces a new radical and a new spin-paired molecule. This is different from homolysis, which results in two radicals from a single spin-paired molecule and doesn’t include a radical as its reactant. Hydrogen abstraction is a fundamental process in radical chemistry because it serves as the final propagation step in many chemical reactions, converting carbon radicals into stable molecules. The figure to the right shows a radical abstraction between a benzoyloxy radical and a hydrogen bromide molecule, resulting in the production of a benzoic acid molecule and a bromine radical.

Addition
Radical addition describes when a radical is added to a spin-paired molecule to form a new radical. The figure on the right shows the addition of a bromine radical to an alkene. Radical addition follows the Anti -Markovnikov rule, where the substituent is added to the less substituted carbon atom.

Elimination
Radical elimination can be viewed as the reverse of radical addition. In radical elimination, an unstable radical compound breaks down into a spin-paired molecule and a new radical compound. Shown below is an example of a radical elimination reaction, where a benzoyloxy radical breaks down into a phenyl radical and a carbon dioxide molecule.

Stability

Stability of organic radicals

Although organic radicals are generally stable intrinsically (in isolation), practically speaking their existence is only transient because they tend to dimerize. Some are quite long-lived. Generally organic radicals are stabilized by any or all of these factors: presence of electronegativity, delocalization, and steric hindrance.  The compound 2,2,6,6-tetramethylpiperidinyloxyl illustrates the combination of all three factors.  It is a commercially available solid that, aside from being magnetic, behaves like a normal organic compound.

Electronegativity 
Organic radicals are inherently electron deficient thus the greater the electronegativity of the atom on which the unpaired electron resides the less stable the radical. Between carbon, nitrogen, and oxygen, for example, carbon is the most stable and oxygen the least stable. 

Electronegativity also factors into the stability of carbon atoms of different hybridizations. Greater s-character correlates to higher electronegativity of the carbon atom (due to the close proximity of s orbitals to the nucleus), and the greater the electronegativity the less stable a radical. sp-hybridized carbons (50% s-character) form the least stable radicals compared to sp3-hybridized carbons (25% s-character) which form the most stable radicals.

Delocalization 
The delocalization of electrons across the structure of a radical, also known as its ability to form one or more resonance structures, allows for the electron-deficiency to be spread over several atoms, minimizing instability. Delocalization usually occurs in the presence of electron-donating groups, such as hydroxyl groups (−OH), ethers (−OR), adjacent alkenes, and amines (−NH2 or −NR), or electron-withdrawing groups, such as C=O or C≡N.

Delocalization effects can also be understood using molecular orbital theory as a lens, more specifically, by examining the intramolecular interaction of the unpaired electron with a donating group’s pair of electrons or the empty π* orbital of an electron-withdrawing group in the form of a molecular orbital diagram. The HOMO of a radical is singly-occupied hence the orbital is aptly referred to as the SOMO, or the Singly-Occupied Molecular Orbital. For an electron-donating group, the SOMO interacts with the lower energy lone pair to form a new lower-energy filled bonding-orbital and a singly-filled new SOMO, higher in energy than the original. While the energy of the unpaired electron has increased, the decrease in energy of the lone pair forming the new bonding orbital outweighs the increase in energy of the new SOMO, resulting in a net decrease of the energy of the molecule. Therefore, electron-donating groups help stabilize radicals.

With a group that is instead electron-withdrawing, the SOMO then interacts with the empty π* orbital. There are no electrons occupying the higher energy orbital formed, while a new SOMO forms that is lower in energy. This results in a lower energy and higher stability of the radical species. Both donating groups and withdrawing groups stabilize radicals.

Another well-known albeit weaker form of delocalization is hyperconjugation. In radical chemistry, radicals are stabilized by hyperconjugation with adjacent alkyl groups. The donation of sigma (σ) C−H bonds into the partially empty radical orbitals helps to differentiate the stabilities of radicals on tertiary, secondary, and primary carbons. Tertiary carbon radicals have three σ C-H bonds that donate, secondary radicals only two, and primary radicals only one. Therefore, tertiary radicals are the most stable and primary radicals the least stable.

Steric hindrance 

Most simply, the greater the steric hindrance the more difficult it is for reactions to take place, and the radical form is favored by default. For example, compare the hydrogen-abstracted form of N-hydroxypiperidine to the molecule TEMPO. TEMPO, or (2,2,6,6-Tetramethylpiperidin-1-yl)oxyl, is too sterically hindered by the additional methyl groups to react making it stable enough to be sold commercially in its radical form. N-Hydroxypiperidine, however, does not have the four methyl groups to impede the way of a reacting molecule so the structure is unstable.

Facile H-atom donors
The stability of many (or most) organic radicals is not indicated by their isolability but is manifested in their ability to function as donors of H•.  This property reflects a weakened bond to hydrogen, usually O−H but sometimes N−H or C−H.  This behavior is important because these H• donors serve as antioxidants in biology and in commerce.  Illustrative is α-tocopherol (vitamin E). The tocopherol radical itself is insufficiently stable for isolation, but the parent molecule is a highly effective hydrogen-atom donor. The C−H bond is weakened in triphenylmethyl (trityl) derivatives.

Inorganic radicals
A large variety of inorganic radicals are stable and in fact isolable.  Examples include most first-row transition metal complexes. 

With regard to main group radicals, the most abundant radical in the universe is also the most abundant chemical in the universe, H•.  Most main group radicals are not however isolable, despite their intrinsic stability.  Hydrogen radicals for example combine eagerly to form H2.  Nitric oxide (NO) is well known example of an isolable inorganic radical.  Fremy's salt (Potassium nitrosodisulfonate, (KSO3)2NO) is a related example. Many thiazyl radicals are known, despite limited extent of π resonance stabilization.

Many radicals can be envisioned as the products of breaking of covalent bonds by homolysis. The homolytic bond dissociation energies, usually abbreviated as "ΔH°" are a measure of bond strength. Splitting H2 into 2 H•, for example, requires a ΔH° of +435 kJ/mol, while splitting Cl2 into two Cl• requires a ΔH° of +243 kJ/mol.  For weak bonds, homolysis can be induced thermally.  Strong bonds require high energy photons or even flames to induce homolysis.

Diradicals
Diradicals are molecules containing two radical centers. Dioxygen (O2) is an important example of a stable diradical. Singlet oxygen, the lowest-energy non-radical state of dioxygen, is less stable than the diradical due to Hund's rule of maximum multiplicity. The relative stability of the oxygen diradical is primarily due to the spin-forbidden nature of the triplet-singlet transition required for it to grab electrons, i.e., "oxidize". The diradical state of oxygen also results in its paramagnetic character, which is demonstrated by its attraction to an external magnet. Diradicals can also occur in metal-oxo complexes, lending themselves for studies of spin forbidden reactions in transition metal chemistry. Carbenes in their triplet state can be viewed as diradicals centred on the same atom, while these are usually highly reactive persistent carbenes are known, with N-heterocyclic carbenes being the most common example.

Triplet carbenes and nitrenes are diradicals.  Their chemical properties are distinct from the properties of their singlet analogues.

Occurrence of radicals

Combustion

A familiar radical reaction is combustion. The oxygen molecule is a stable diradical, best represented by •O–O•. Because spins of the electrons are parallel, this molecule is stable.  While the ground state of oxygen is this unreactive spin-unpaired (triplet) diradical, an extremely reactive spin-paired (singlet) state is available. For combustion to occur, the energy barrier between these must be overcome. This barrier can be overcome by heat, requiring high temperatures.  The triplet-singlet transition is also "forbidden".  This presents an additional barrier to the reaction.  It also means molecular oxygen is relatively unreactive at room temperature except in the presence of a catalytic heavy atom such as iron or copper.

Combustion consists of various radical chain reactions that the singlet radical can initiate. The flammability of a given material strongly depends on the concentration of radicals that must be obtained before initiation and propagation reactions dominate leading to combustion of the material. Once the combustible material has been consumed, termination reactions again dominate and the flame dies out.  As indicated,  promotion of propagation or termination reactions alters flammability.  For example, because lead itself deactivates radicals in the gasoline-air mixture, tetraethyl lead was once commonly added to gasoline. This prevents the combustion from initiating in an uncontrolled manner or in unburnt residues (engine knocking) or premature ignition (preignition).

When a hydrocarbon is burned, a large number of different oxygen radicals are involved. Initially, hydroperoxyl radical (HOO•) are formed. These then react further to give organic hydroperoxides that break up into hydroxyl radicals (HO•).

Polymerization
Many polymerization reactions are initiated by radicals. Polymerization involves an initial radical adding to non-radical (usually an alkene) to give new radicals.  This process is the basis of the radical chain reaction. The art of polymerization entails the method by which the initiating radical is introduced.  For example, methyl methacrylate (MMA) can be polymerized to produce Poly(methyl methacrylate) (PMMA - Plexiglas or Perspex) via a repeating series of radical addition steps:  

Newer radical polymerization methods are known as living radical polymerization.  Variants include reversible addition-fragmentation chain transfer (RAFT) and atom transfer radical polymerization (ATRP).

Being a prevalent radical, O2 reacts with many organic compounds to generate radicals together with the hydroperoxide radical. Drying oils and alkyd paints harden due to radical crosslinking initiated by oxygen from the atmosphere.

Atmospheric radicals

The most common radical in the lower atmosphere is molecular dioxygen. Photodissociation of source molecules produces other radicals.

In the upper atmosphere, the photodissociation of normally unreactive chlorofluorocarbons (CFCs) by solar ultraviolet radiation is an important source of radicals (see eq. 1 below). These reactions give the chlorine radical, Cl•, which catalyzes the conversion of ozone to O2, thus facilitating ozone depletion (– below).

Such reactions cause the depletion of the ozone layer, especially since the chlorine radical is free to engage in another reaction chain; consequently, the use of chlorofluorocarbons as refrigerants has been restricted.

In biology

Radicals play important roles in biology.  Many of these are necessary for life, such as the intracellular killing of bacteria by phagocytic cells such as granulocytes and macrophages. Radicals are involved in cell signalling processes, known as redox signaling.  For example, radical attack of linoleic acid produces a series of 13-hydroxyoctadecadienoic acids and 9-hydroxyoctadecadienoic acids, which may act to regulate localized tissue inflammatory and/or healing responses, pain perception, and the proliferation of malignant cells. Radical attacks on arachidonic acid and docosahexaenoic acid produce a similar but broader array of signaling products.

Radicals may also be involved in Parkinson's disease, senile and drug-induced deafness, schizophrenia, and Alzheimer's. The classic free-radical syndrome, the iron-storage disease hemochromatosis, is typically associated with a constellation of free-radical-related symptoms including movement disorder, psychosis, skin pigmentary melanin abnormalities, deafness, arthritis, and diabetes mellitus. The free-radical theory of aging proposes that radicals underlie the aging process itself. Similarly, the process of mitohormesis suggests that repeated exposure to radicals may extend life span.

Because radicals are necessary for life, the body has a number of mechanisms to minimize radical-induced damage and to repair damage that occurs, such as the enzymes superoxide dismutase, catalase, glutathione peroxidase and glutathione reductase. In addition, antioxidants play a key role in these defense mechanisms. These are often the three vitamins, vitamin A, vitamin C and vitamin E and polyphenol antioxidants. Furthermore, there is good evidence indicating that bilirubin and uric acid can act as antioxidants to help neutralize certain radicals. Bilirubin comes from the breakdown of red blood cells' contents, while uric acid is a breakdown product of purines. Too much bilirubin, though, can lead to jaundice, which could eventually damage the central nervous system, while too much uric acid causes gout.

Reactive oxygen species
Reactive oxygen species or ROS are species such as superoxide, hydrogen peroxide, and hydroxyl radical, commonly associated with cell damage. ROS form as a natural by-product of the normal metabolism of oxygen and have important roles in cell signaling.
Two important oxygen-centered radicals are superoxide and hydroxyl radical. They derive from molecular oxygen under reducing conditions. However, because of their reactivity, these same radicals can participate in unwanted side reactions resulting in cell damage. Excessive amounts of these radicals can lead to cell injury and death, which may contribute to many diseases such as cancer, stroke, myocardial infarction, diabetes and major disorders. Many forms of cancer are thought to be the result of reactions between radicals and DNA, potentially resulting in mutations that can adversely affect the cell cycle and potentially lead to malignancy. Some of the symptoms of aging such as atherosclerosis are also attributed to radical induced oxidation of cholesterol to 7-ketocholesterol. In addition radicals contribute to alcohol-induced liver damage, perhaps more than alcohol itself. Radicals produced by cigarette smoke are implicated in inactivation of alpha 1-antitrypsin in the lung. This process promotes the development of emphysema.

Oxybenzone has been found to form radicals in sunlight, and therefore may be associated with cell damage as well. This only occurred when it was combined with other ingredients commonly found in sunscreens, like titanium oxide and octyl methoxycinnamate.

ROS attack the polyunsaturated fatty acid, linoleic acid, to form a series of 13-hydroxyoctadecadienoic acid and 9-hydroxyoctadecadienoic acid products that serve as signaling molecules that may trigger responses that counter the tissue injury which caused their formation.  ROS attacks other polyunsaturated fatty acids, e.g. arachidonic acid and docosahexaenoic acid, to produce a similar series of signaling products.

Reactive oxygen species are also used in controlled reactions involving singlet dioxygen  known as type II photooxygenation reactions after Dexter energy transfer (triplet-triplet annihilation) from natural triplet dioxygen  and triplet excited state of a photosensitizer. Typical chemical transformations with this singlet dioxygen species involve, among others, conversion of cellulosic biowaste into new poylmethine dyes.

History and nomenclature

Until late in the 20th century the word "radical" was used in chemistry to indicate any connected group of atoms, such as a methyl group or a carboxyl, whether it was part of a larger molecule or a molecule on its own. The qualifier "free" was then needed to specify the unbound case.  Following recent nomenclature revisions, a part of a larger molecule is now called a functional group or substituent, and "radical" now implies "free".  However, the old nomenclature may still appear in some books.

The term radical was already in use when the now obsolete radical theory was developed. Louis-Bernard Guyton de Morveau introduced the phrase "radical" in 1785 and the phrase was employed by Antoine Lavoisier in 1789 in his Traité Élémentaire de Chimie. A radical was then identified as the root base of certain acids (the Latin word "radix" meaning "root"). Historically, the term radical in radical theory was also used for bound parts of the molecule, especially when they remain unchanged in reactions. These are now called functional groups. For example, methyl alcohol was described as consisting of a methyl "radical" and a hydroxyl "radical". Neither are radicals in the modern chemical sense, as they are permanently bound to each other, and have no unpaired, reactive electrons; however, they can be observed as radicals in mass spectrometry when broken apart by irradiation with energetic electrons.

In a modern context the first organic (carbon–containing) radical identified was the triphenylmethyl radical, (C6H5)3C•.  This species was discovered by Moses Gomberg in 1900. In 1933 Morris S. Kharasch and Frank Mayo proposed that free radicals were responsible for anti-Markovnikov addition of hydrogen bromide to allyl bromide.

In most fields of chemistry, the historical definition of radicals contends that the molecules have nonzero electron spin. However, in fields including spectroscopy and astrochemistry, the definition is slightly different. Gerhard Herzberg, who won the Nobel prize for his research into the electron structure and geometry of radicals, suggested a looser definition of free radicals: "any transient (chemically unstable) species (atom, molecule, or ion)". The main point of his suggestion is that there are many chemically unstable molecules that have zero spin, such as C2, C3, CH2 and so on. This definition is more convenient for discussions of transient chemical processes and astrochemistry; therefore researchers in these fields prefer to use this loose definition.

Depiction in chemical reactions
 
In chemical equations, radicals are frequently denoted by a dot placed immediately to the right of the atomic symbol or molecular formula as follows:

Radical reaction mechanisms use single-headed arrows to depict the movement of single electrons:

The homolytic cleavage of the breaking bond is drawn with a 'fish-hook' arrow to distinguish from the usual movement of two electrons depicted by a standard curly arrow. The second electron of the breaking bond also moves to pair up with the attacking radical electron; this is not explicitly indicated in this case.

Radicals also take part in radical addition and radical substitution as reactive intermediates. Chain reactions involving radicals can usually be divided into three distinct processes.  These are initiation, propagation, and termination.
Initiation reactions are those that result in a net increase in the number of radicals. They may involve the formation of radicals from stable species as in Reaction 1 above or they may involve reactions of radicals with stable species to form more radicals.
Propagation reactions are those reactions involving radicals in which the total number of radicals remains the same.
Termination reactions are those reactions resulting in a net decrease in the number of radicals. Typically two radicals combine to form a more stable species, for example:
2 Cl• → Cl2

See also
 Electron pair
 Globally Harmonized System of Classification and Labelling of Chemicals
 Hofmann–Löffler reaction
Free radical research
 ARC Centre of Excellence for Free Radical Chemistry and Biotechnology

References

 
Articles containing video clips
Biological processes
Biomolecules
Chemical bonding
Environmental chemistry
Senescence